Nikolay Valerievich Bolshakov (born May 11, 1977) is a Russian cross-country skier who has competed since 2000. He won the bronze medal in the 4 × 10 km relay at the 2005 FIS Nordic World Ski Championships in Oberstdorf.

Bolschakov's best individual finish was a 14th in a 10 km event in Finland in 2005.

Cross-country skiing results
All results are sourced from the International Ski Federation (FIS).

Olympic Games

World Championships
 1 medal – (1 bronze)

World Cup

Season standings

Team podiums

 1 victory – (1 )
 6 podiums – (6 )

References

External links

Russian male cross-country skiers
Olympic cross-country skiers of Russia
Cross-country skiers at the 2002 Winter Olympics
1977 births
Living people
FIS Nordic World Ski Championships medalists in cross-country skiing